The Heinz dilemma is a frequently used example in many ethics and morality classes. One well-known version of the dilemma, used in Lawrence Kohlberg's stages of moral development, is stated as follows:

From a theoretical point of view, it is not important what the participant thinks that Heinz should do. Kohlberg's theory holds that the justification the participant offers is what is significant, the form of their response. Below are some of many examples of possible arguments that belong to the six stages:

References

Thought experiments in ethics
Morality
Moral psychology
Dilemmas
1981 introductions